Sovereign Press, Incorporated is a publisher and distributor of role-playing games based in Lake Geneva, Wisconsin.  It was founded in 1998 by Margaret Weis and Don Perrin and is one of two companies that Weis owns.

Games produced 

Sovereign Press released the Sovereign Stone role-playing game, based on the Sovereign Stone novels, by Larry Elmore and Don Perrin and had the license from Wizards of the Coast to release new Dragonlance role-playing products.  The publishing of fiction set in the Dragonlance milieu is still handled by Wizards of the Coast.  

Products produced for Dragonlance  were:
 Age of Mortals: Dragonlance Campaign Setting Companion
 Dragonlance Dungeon Master's Screen
 Key of Destiny: Dragonlance Age of Mortals Campaign, Vol. I
 Bestiary of Krynn
 Towers of High Sorcery: A Dragonlance d20 System Supplement
 War of the Lance: Dragonlance Campaign Setting Supplement
 Tasslehoff's Map Pouch: The Age of Mortals
 Spectre of Sorrows: Age of Mortals Campaign, Volume II
 Holy Orders of the Stars
 Dragonlance Starter Pack
 Legends of the Twins: Dragonlance Campaign Setting Companion
 Tasslehoff's Map Pouch: The War of the Lance
 Knightly Orders of Ansalon
 Dragons of Autumn: War of the Lance Chronicles, Volume I
 Price of Courage: Age of Mortals Campaign, Volume III
 Bestiary of Krynn (Revised)
 Tasslehoff's Map Pouch: Legends
 Races of Ansalon
 Dragons of Krynn
 Dragons of Winter: War of the Lance Chronicles, Volume II
 Lost Leaves From the Inn of the Last Home
 Dragons of Spring: War of the Lance Chronicles, Vol. 3

Under the Sovereign Stone imprint, Sovereign Press produced ten books and all save one were using the d20 system.

After the founding of Margaret Weis Productions 

In 2004, after Margaret Weis and Don Perrin divorced, Margaret Weis founded Margaret Weis Productions which used the Sovereign Stone system as the basis for the Cortex System and the Serenity RPG.  The Sovereign Stone website was deleted at the end of July 2004.  In early 2008 the rights to Dragonlance reverted to Wizards of the Coast with the final book in the line, Dragons of Spring, being produced in January 2008.  The Sovereign Press website closed down at the end of 2008 with dragonlance.com not being updated after June 2009 and being taken down in early 2011.

References

External links 

Companies based in Wisconsin
Publishing companies established in 1998
Role-playing game publishing companies